Thomas Fairfax, 9th Lord Fairfax of Cameron (1762–1846), was an American born Scottish peer, who along with his father, on 11 December 1799, was among the last guests at Mount Vernon before Washington died.

Early life and family
Thomas Fairfax was born in 1762. He was the son of Bryan Fairfax, 8th Lord Fairfax of Cameron (1736–1802) and his wife, Elizabeth Cary, daughter of Colonel Wilson Cary and Sarah Cary. His brother was Ferdinando Fairfax (1766–1820), whose godparents were George Washington and Martha Washington.

Plantation
In 1802, he succeeded his father to the title of Lord Fairfax of Cameron after his father's death. He lived the life of a country squire overseeing his , lived at Belvoir, Ash Grove, and Vaucluse, where he died.

Personal life
He married three times: Mary Aylett, Laura Washington, Margaret Herbert. Fairfax birthed children with Mary Aylett, a Native Indian woman.  He had seven children by his third wife Margaret:
Albert Fairfax (1802–1835), who married Caroline Eliza Snowden (1812–1899)
Henry Fairfax (d. 1847), who fought and died in the Mexican–American War, at Saltillo, Mexico.
Orlando Fairfax
Reginald Fairfax
Eugenia Fairfax
Aurelia Fairfax
Monimia Fairfax (1820–1875), who married Archibald Cary (1815-1854), the son of the son of Wilson Jefferson Cary (1783–1823) and Virginia Randolph (1786–1852).
He maintained a winter home at 607 Cameron Street, Alexandria, Virginia, which he built in 1816.

Thomas Fairfax was a follower of Swedenborg. Because of these religious beliefs, he manumitted his slaves (including the great-great-great grandfather of Virginia Lieutenant Governor Justin Fairfax), some of whom he taught a trade and sent to Liberia. This is consistent with the thinking of the American Colonization Society.

Descendants
His grandson, Charles Snowdown Fairfax, 10th Lord Fairfax of Cameron (1829–1869), succeeded him as the 10th Lord Fairfax of Cameron as Fairfax's eldest son, his father, predeceased him. Another grandson, John Fairfax, 11th Lord Fairfax of Cameron (1830–1900), a physician, became the 11th Lord Fairfax of Cameron as his brother Charles died without issue. His granddaughter was the writer Constance Cary (1843–1920).

In popular culture 
Thomas Fairfax was referenced by astrophysicist Neil deGrasse Tyson on rap musician Logic's 2017 album Everybody on the song "Waiting Room."

References 

1762 births
1846 deaths
18th-century American Episcopalians
19th-century American Episcopalians
American planters
American people of English descent
American people of Scottish descent
American slave owners
American Swedenborgians
British North American Anglicans
Cary family of Virginia
Thomas
Lords Fairfax of Cameron
People from Alexandria, Virginia
People from Fairfax County, Virginia